Mo Boma was an ambient music ensemble from Boston, Massachusetts, formed in 1989 by Skúli Sverrisson and Carsten Tiedemann. Their name comes from a pygmy lullaby for girls. In 1990, Jamshied Sharifi joined the group as well. Their second album Myths of the Near Future Part One was released in 1994 and was the first in a trilogy of works based on Myths of the Near Future by J. G. Ballard.

Discography 
Studio albums
Jijimuge (1992, Extreme)
Myths of the Near Future Part One (1994, Extreme)
Myths of the Near Future Part Two (1995, Extreme)
Myths of the Near Future Part Three (1996, Extreme)

References

External links 
 
 

American ambient music groups
Extreme Records artists
Musical groups from Boston
Musical groups established in 1989
Musical groups disestablished in 1996
American musical trios